Ceroplesis burgeoni is a species of beetle in the family Cerambycidae. It was described by Breuning in 1935, in the French entomological journal Novitates Entomologicae. It is known from the Democratic Republic of Congo.

References

burgeoni
Beetles described in 1935
Endemic fauna of the Democratic Republic of the Congo